Prindle may refer to:

Geography
Mount Prindle, granite massif in eastern Alaska
Prindle Volcano, extinct cinder-cone in eastern Alaska
Prindle, Washington, community in Skamania County

People
Cyrus Prindle (1800–1885), American abolitionist
Eric Prindle (born 1976), American professional mixed martial artist
Mike Prindle (born 1963), American football player
Edwin J. Prindle (1868–1948), American patent office worker

Other
PRNDL (Park, Reverse, Neutral, Drive, and Low; pronounced and sometimes spelled prindle), a vehicle's gear shifter housing
Prindle 18 and Prindle 18-2, American catamaran designs by Geoffrey Prindle

See also